Bourgueticrinidae is a family of crinoids, containing 2 genera.

Genera
 Conocrinus d'Orbigny, 1850
 Democrinus Perrier, 1883

References

 Thuy B, Gale AS, Kroh A, Kucera M, Numberger-Thuy LD, Reich M, et al. (2012) Ancient Origin of the Modern Deep-Sea Fauna. PLoS ONE 7(10): e46913. doi:10.1371/journal.pone.0046913

Bourgueticrinida
Echinoderm families
Extant Early Cretaceous first appearances